Ponnambalam Selvarasa (born 25 July 1946)  is a Sri Lankan Tamil politician and former Member of Parliament.

Early life
Selvarasa was born on 25 July 1946.

Career
Selvarasa was one of the Tamil United Liberation Front's candidates for Batticaloa District at the 1994 parliamentary election. He was elected and entered Parliament. He failed to get re-elected at the 2000 parliamentary election.

On 20 October 2001 the All Ceylon Tamil Congress, Eelam People's Revolutionary Liberation Front, Tamil Eelam Liberation Organization and TULF formed the Tamil National Alliance (TNA). Selvarasa contested the 2010 parliamentary election as one of the TNA's candidates in Batticaloa District. He was elected and re-entered Parliament. He failed to get re-elected at the 2015 parliamentary election.

Electoral history

References

1946 births
Illankai Tamil Arasu Kachchi politicians
Living people
Members of the 10th Parliament of Sri Lanka
Members of the 14th Parliament of Sri Lanka
People from Eastern Province, Sri Lanka
Sri Lankan Hindus
Sri Lankan Tamil civil servants
Sri Lankan Tamil politicians
Tamil National Alliance politicians
Tamil United Liberation Front politicians